James Chester Arthur Hefner Jr. (August 2, 1913 - May 2, 1988) was an American professional baseball center fielder in the Negro leagues. He played with the New York Black Yankees in 1948, and the Philadelphia Stars in 1949.

Early life and career
Heffner was born in Transylvania County, North Carolina on August 2, 1913, the son of James Chester Arthur and Mary Hefner (né Davis).   He made his Negro Major leagues debut on April 25, 1948 with the New York Black Yankees. In February 1949, following the disbanding of the Yankees (itself part of the larger Negro league contraction necessitated by the exodus of star players to the recently integrated Major Leagues), Heffner was initially drafted by the Birmingham Black Barons, but then acquired by Philadelphia prior to the start of the regular season.

Post-retirement
Following his baseball career, Hefner was employed by DuPont and served as a deacon in the Bethel "A" Baptist Church in Brevard.

References

Further reading

 Dispatch staff (August 25, 1945). "Negro Squads Clash". The York Dispatch. p. 8
 Telegraph staff (August 28, 1945). "Nashville Boasts Strong Infield". Harrisburg Telegraph. p. 11
 Telegraph staff (August 29, 1945). "Baltimore Giants to Face Nashville on Island Tonight". Harrisburg Telegraph. p. 13
 Journal staff (July 17, 1947). "Insilcos Face Asheville, N.C., Blues, Negro Southern Loop Champions, Tonight; Invaders Rated One of Top Colored Teams in Country". The Meriden Journal. p. 6
 Times staff (May 7, 1948). "Grays Battle Black Yankees". Chester Times. p. 20
 Lyle, George, Jr. (May 28, 1949). "On the Limb". New Journal and Guide. p. 12
 News staff (May 31, 1949). "Davis Excels as Houston Conquers Stars, 5 to 4". The Wilmington Morning News. p. 13
 News staff (July 11, 1949). "Mays' Single Gives Black Barons Win". The Birmingham News. p. 18
 Tribune staff (August 5, 1949). "Philly Stars and American Giants Split Doublebill". Alabama Tribune. p. 6
 C-T staff (September 18, 1952). "Negro Recreational Officers Are Named". Asheville Citizen Times. p. 12 
 C-T staff (April 11, 1955). "Asheville Blues Whip Spinners". Asheville Citizen Times. p. 14
 C-T staff (May 22, 1957). "Corporations Are Chartered". Asheville Citizen Times. p. 9
 C-T staff (December 1, 1974). "News About Western North Carolina". Asheville Citizen Times. p. 11

External links
 and Baseball-Reference Black Baseball stats and Seamheads

New York Black Yankees players
Philadelphia Stars players
1913 births
1988 deaths
Baseball outfielders
Baseball players from North Carolina
20th-century African-American sportspeople
Baptists from the United States
Deacons